List of the members of the Faroese Løgting in the period 2015–2019, they were elected at the general election on 1 September 2015. The parliament has 33 members this period. Two persons left their parties a few days after the election. Sonja Jógvansdóttir left the Social Democratic Party on 15 September 2015. According to her it was because she couldn't live with the fact that her own party was the one who blocked the possibility of mentioning the possibility of Civil marriage between same-sex couples in the coalition-agreement between the three government parties. Jógvansdóttir was the first Faroese person who is openly homosexual, who has been elected to the Løgting. The second person who left her party was Annika Olsen, who left People's Party on 9 September 2015 because of disagreements and joined Progress on 17 September 2015 and became chairperson of the Standing Committee of Finance of the Løgting.

The government during this legislature is the Cabinet of Aksel V. Johannesen; a coalition of the Social Democratic Party, Republic and Progress, supported by Jógvansdóttir.

References

 2015
2015 in the Faroe Islands
2015–2019